Snappy Snaps is a British photographic services franchise established in 1983 by Don Kennedy and Tim MacAndrews.

History
 there are 120 Snappy Snaps franchise locations throughout the UK. Branches offer various services including one-hour film processing and digital photo printing.

The first Snappy Snaps one hour photo store opened in 1983. A further three trial stores were added during the following three years and, following the success of these stores, the first franchised Snappy Snaps store opened for business in 1987.

Snappy Snaps was also involved with the now abandoned UK identity card scheme.

The Snappy Snaps branch in Hampstead, London, featured in the news after the singer George Michael drove into the front of the building in the early hours of Sunday 4 July 2010 whilst under the influence of cannabis and prescription medication. Following Michael's death on Christmas Day 2016, the shop became the site of a "shrine" to the late singer, with fans leaving flowers, cards, messages and toys outside the shop front, much to the annoyance of the store management.

References

Retail companies of the United Kingdom
Photographic retailers
British companies established in 1983
Retail companies established in 1983
Franchises
Photography companies of the United Kingdom
1983 establishments in the United Kingdom